Sutton is the primary village and a census-designated place (CDP) in the town of Sutton, Caledonia County, Vermont, United States. It was first listed as a CDP prior to the 2020 census.

The village is in northern Caledonia County, in the southern part of the town of Sutton. It sits on a hillside draining southward to Calendar Brook, a southeast-flowing tributary of the West Branch of the Passumpsic River, part of the Connecticut River watershed.

References 

Populated places in Caledonia County, Vermont
Census-designated places in Caledonia County, Vermont
Census-designated places in Vermont